Reveille with Beverly is a 1943 American musical film starring Ann Miller, Franklin Pangborn, and Larry Parks directed by Charles Barton, released by Columbia Pictures, based on the Reveille with Beverly radio show hosted by Jean Ruth.  It is also the name of the subsequent soundtrack album.

The film featured a number of notable guest appearances by such important big band era musicians as Duke Ellington, Count Basie, Frank Sinatra, The Mills Brothers, Bob Crosby, Freddie Slack, and Ella Mae Morse.

In his narration for the 1977 documentary film Life Goes to War, Johnny Carson remarked that while he was stationed on Guam during World War II, he had "memorized the entire scoreand most of the dialogueof Reveille with Beverly".

Plot

Beverly Ross wants to be a radio personality, but has to run the switchboard at a local station. The blustery station owner Mr. Kennedy wants no part of programming the "jive that she loves", preferring the classics. She sends the pompous early-morning personality Vernon Lewis away for a vacation, so she can transform his dull classical-music program into a jive session. She invites suggestions and requests, and is swamped by mail from soldiers. She now devotes her show to the military, and the program becomes a success as "Reveille with Beverly." Much of the film consists of musical numbers, visually representing the records she plays. The thin storyline connecting the songs concerns itself with Beverly and Lewis vying for control of the show, resulting in Beverly constantly leaving and returning to her old job at a record store.

Cast

 Ann Miller as Beverly Ross
 William Wright as Barry Lang
 Dick Purcell as Andy Adams
 Franklin Pangborn as Vernon Lewis
 Tim Ryan as Mr. Kennedy
 Larry Parks as Eddie Ross
 Barbara Brown as Mrs. Beverly Ross
 Douglas Leavitt as Mr. Ross
 Adele Mara as Evelyn Ross
 Walter Sande as Pvt. Puckett, aka Canvasback
 Wally Vernon as Stomp McCoy
 Andrew Tombes as Mr. Smith, record-store owner
 Irene Ryan as Elsie (uncredited)
 Doodles Weaver as Elmer (uncredited)
 Bob Crosby Orchestra as themselves
 Freddie Slack and His Orchestra as themselves
 Ella Mae Morse as herself
 Duke Ellington Orchestra as themselves
 Frank Sinatra as himself
 The Mills Brothers as themselves
 The Radio Rogues as themselves/Specialty Act
 Count Basie as Orchestra Leader

Soundtrack
 One O'Clock Jump
 Written by Count Basie
 Played by Count Basie and His Orchestra
 Take the 'A' Train
 Written by Billy Strayhorn
 Sung by Betty Roche with Duke Ellington and the Duke Ellington Orchestra
 Big Noise from Winnetka
 Music by Ray Bauduc and Bob Haggart
 Lyrics by Ben Pollack and Bob Crosby
 Played by Bob Crosby and his Orchestra with vocals by Lee Wilde, Lyn Wilde, and David Street
 Cow-Cow Boogie
 Written by Benny Carter, Gene de Paul, and Don Raye
 Sung by Ella Mae Morse with Freddie Slack and His Orchestra
 Cielito Lindo
 Written by Quirino Mendoza
 Adapted with English lyrics by Bill Driggs
 Performed by The Mills Brothers
 Sweet Lucy Brown
 Written by Leon René and Otis René
 Performed by The Mills Brothers
 Thumbs Up and V for Victory
 Music by Ted Fio Rito
 Lyrics by Paul Francis Webster
 Sung and Danced by Ann Miller with chorus
 Night and Day
 Written by Cole Porter
 Sung by Frank Sinatra
 Wabash Moon
 Written by Dave Dreyer and Morton Downey
 Performed by The Radio Rogues
 When the Moon Comes Over the Mountain
 Music by Harry M. Woods
 Lyrics by Howard Johnson
 Performed by The Radio Rogues

References

External links
 
 
 
 

1943 films
American black-and-white films
Films directed by Charles Barton
Columbia Pictures films
1943 musical films
1940s English-language films
American World War II films
World War II films based on actual events
World War II films made in wartime
American musical films